Tuva Ulsaker Høve (born 11 June 2000) is a Norwegian handball player who plays for Vipers Kristiansand.

On 12 February 2021, it was announced that she had signed a 3-year contract with Vipers Kristiansand.

She also represented Norway at the 2017 European Women's U-17 Handball Championship, placing second, at the 2018 Women's Youth World Handball Championship, placing 11th and at the 2019 Women's U-19 European Handball Championship, placing third.

Achievements
European Women's U-19 Handball Championship:
Bronze Medalist: 2019
Youth European Championship:
Silver Medalist: 2017
EHF Champions League:
Winner: 2021/2022
Norwegian League:
Winner: 2021/2022
Norwegian Cup:
Winner: 2021, 2022/23

Individual awards
 All-Star Right Wing of REMA 1000-ligaen: 2020/2021

References

2000 births
Living people
Norwegian female handball players
People from Trondheim
21st-century Norwegian women